Queienfeld is a former municipality in the district Schmalkalden-Meiningen, in Thuringia, Germany. As of December 2007 it became part of Grabfeld.

Former municipalities in Thuringia
Duchy of Saxe-Meiningen